Pigeon House Branch is a  long tributary to Crabtree Creek in Wake County, North Carolina and is classed as a 2nd order stream on the EPA waters geoviewer site.

Course
Pigeon House Branch rises in downtown Raleigh, North Carolina then flows northeast to meet Crabtree Creek just upstream of Bridges Branch.  It is one of the more developed tributaries with less than 1% of the watershed considered to be forested.

Watershed
Pigeon House Branch drains  of area that is underlaid by Raleigh Gneiss geology.  The watershed receives an average of 46.7 in/year of precipitation and has a wetness index of 433.76.

See also
List of rivers of North Carolina

References

External links
 An urban exploration of Raleigh's most forgotten waterway (and future river walk)
 Hidden Triangle: We revisit downtown Raleigh's hidden tunnels, waterway

Rivers of North Carolina
Rivers of Wake County, North Carolina
Tributaries of Pamlico Sound